Santa Fe Building may refer to:

Santa Fe Building (Amarillo), a building in Amarillo, Texas
Santa Fe Building (Chicago), a building in Chicago, Illinois